Australian Fast Foods Pty Limited was an Australian fast food company that owned the Red Rooster and Chicken Treat restaurant chains. In 2007 the company was reorganised into Quick Service Restaurant Holdings, now Craveable Brands. The company was based in Balcatta, Western Australia and employed 6,956 people. As owner of Red Rooster and Chicken Treat it was the joint fifth largest fast food operator in Australia after McDonald's, KFC, Hungry Jack's and Subway, with 450 outlets.

History
Red Rooster (Kelmscott WA) was founded in 1972 by the Kailis Family of Western Australia. Chicken Treat was founded in 1974 and joined with Big Rooster to form Australian Fast Foods Pty Ltd in 1989. Australian Fast Foods sold Red Rooster to Coles in 1992, which then bought Big Rooster stores and amalgamated them, and then sold it back in 2002. First outlets were established in New Zealand. in 2005.

In 2007, Romano bought out Tana's share in Australian Fast Foods, and with Quadrant formed Quick Service Restaurant Holdings, which now owns Red Rooster and Chicken Treat.

References

External links
 AFF major takeover of rivals

Australian companies established in 1974
Retail companies established in 1974
Food and drink companies based in Perth, Western Australia
Holding companies of Australia